The Edinburgh derby is an informal title given to any football match played between Scottish clubs Heart of Midlothian (Hearts) and Hibernian (Hibs), the two oldest professional clubs based in Edinburgh, Scotland. The two clubs have a fierce rivalry that dates back to the clubs being founded in the mid-1870s, which makes it one of the longest running rivalries in world football. The first match between the clubs was played on the Meadows on Christmas Day 1875.

The matches are normally played at either Easter Road or Tynecastle. It has been regularly played in the top level of the Scottish football league system, although derbies were played in the second tier during the 2014–15 season. The teams sometimes also play against one another in cup tournaments, such as the Scottish Cup and Scottish League Cup. The clubs have met twice in Scottish Cup Finals, in 1896 and 2012, both of which were won by Hearts.

History

Hearts and Hibs were both formed during the mid-1870s. The first ever match between the clubs was played at East Meadows on 25 December 1875, with Hearts winning 1–0. Hibs won the first Scottish Cup tie between the clubs, in 1877–78. The matches that established the two clubs as the principal sides in Edinburgh was the five game struggle for the EFA Cup later that season, which Hearts won 3–2 after four previous attempts ended in draws. Hibs beat Hearts on the way to their first national trophy, the 1886–87 Scottish Cup. Hibs also had wins of 3–0, 5–2 and 7–1 against Hearts in other competitions.

Hibs had major financial problems and briefly ceased playing during the early 1890s. In the meantime, Hearts had become founder members of the Scottish Football League in 1890–91. Hibs soon resumed operations and Hearts won 10–2 in a friendly match at Easter Road which marked their return. Hibs joined the Scottish Football League in 1893–94 and were promoted to the First Division in 1895. The first league derby was played on 28 September 1895, Hearts winning 4–3 at Tynecastle.

The clubs contested the 1896 Scottish Cup Final, which Hearts won 3–1 at Logie Green in Edinburgh. It is the only time a Scottish Cup Final has been played outside Glasgow. The derby was played regularly in the league until 1930–31, when Hibs were relegated from Division One, although matches in other competitions continued. Hibs regained top division status in 1933–34, but all league football was suspended from 1939–40 to 1945–46 due to the Second World War.

The record crowd for an Edinburgh derby was 65,860 on 2 January 1950 when Hearts won 2–1 at Easter Road. This was also the biggest crowd for any Scottish game played outside Glasgow. The post-war period was a golden age for football in Edinburgh, as Hibs won three league championships with their Famous Five forward line, while Hearts won several major trophies in the late 1950s and early 1960s.

Hibs enjoyed a sustained period of success in the fixture in the late 1960s and most of the 1970s. Their record victory against Hearts, 7–0 at Tynecastle on 1 January 1973, was achieved during this period. Hibs then had their longest unbeaten streak in the fixture, 12 games from 1974 to 1978. Scottish league football was restructured from the 1975–76 season to create smaller divisions, resulting in the teams playing each other four times a season in the league, but it also increased the risk of the clubs being relegated. Hearts were a yo-yo club in the late 1970s and early 1980s, while Hibs were also relegated in 1979–80. This meant that there were few derbies until Hearts returned to the Premier Division in 1983–84.

Hearts then took the upper hand in the derby, setting the record for consecutive derbies without a loss, a 22-game streak straddling the 1980s and 1990s. During this period, Hearts owner Wallace Mercer attempted to force through a merger of the two clubs by acquiring a majority shareholding in Hibs. This effort failed after protest groups set up by Hibs fans persuaded some shareholders not to sell to Mercer and new investment in Hibs was provided by Tom Farmer.

The clubs met in a 2005–06 Scottish Cup semi-final, in the knowledge that victory would lead to a final against Gretna, who were a Second Division club. Hearts won the semi-final against Hibs by 4–0 and went on to win the competition on a penalty shootout in the final. Hibs gained some revenge the following season by winning a 2006–07 Scottish League Cup quarter-final against Hearts 1–0, and went on to win the competition.

The two clubs met in the 2012 Scottish Cup Final. The match was played at Hampden Park in Glasgow, despite some fans proposing that it should be moved to Murrayfield Stadium, the largest venue in Edinburgh. Hearts won a one-sided final by 5–1, having also won all three league derbies in the 2011–12 Scottish Premier League. Hibs gained some revenge for this defeat six months later by knocking Hearts out of the 2012–13 Scottish Cup, winning 1–0 in a fourth round tie at Easter Road. It also ended a run of 12 games without a win for Hibs in the derby.

Both clubs were relegated to the second tier after finishing in the bottom two positions of the 2013–14 Scottish Premiership. This meant that the city of Edinburgh was left without representation in the top tier of the Scottish league system for the first time in its history. Hearts won the 2014–15 Scottish Championship and earned an immediate promotion back to the top tier. Hibs won promotion in 2016–17, which meant that top-flight league derbies were resumed in 2017–18. Meanwhile, the teams were drawn together in the Scottish Cup in three consecutive seasons: 2015–16, 2016–17 and 2017–18. Hibs won the first two ties after replays and went on to win the 2015–16 competition, while Hearts won the third tie.

Hearts were relegated to the Championship in 2020 after the 2019–20 season was curtailed by the Covid-19 pandemic in Scotland. In the semi-finals of the 2019–20 Scottish Cup, which were delayed until the autumn by the pandemic, Hearts won 2–1 after extra time against Hibs. Hearts were promoted back to the top flight in 2021, before winning the 2021–22 Scottish Cup semi-final against Hibs.

Local competitions and other Edinburgh clubs

In the late 19th and early 20th century, the clubs often met each other ten times in a single season due to the plethora of local competitions, such as the East of Scotland Shield, Rosebery Charity Cup, Wilson Cup, and the Dunedin Cup. These competitions also involved the other clubs in Edinburgh and the surrounding area. Hearts and Hibs were the most frequent winners of these competitions. The East of Scotland Shield is the only one of the local competitions that is contested by Hearts and Hibs today, albeit by young reserve teams. The Shield is contested by a one-off match and gate takings are given to the Edinburgh Football Association.

St Bernard's, Leith Athletic, the original Edinburgh City and Meadowbank Thistle all represented the city of Edinburgh in the Scottish Football League. As Hibs did not enter the league until the 1893–94 season, the first league derby was actually played between Hearts and Leith Athletic on 24 October 1891 (Hearts winning 3–1). The first league derby between Hearts and Hibs was played at Tynecastle on 28 September 1895, with Hearts winning 4–3. The four teams took part in the Lord Provost's Rent Relief Cup in late 1921 to raise money for the unemployed (a Glasgow version was also played); the final was between Hearts and Hibs (won by Hearts), but was not played until May 1923.

The introduction of the Scottish football pyramid system allowed Edinburgh City to gain promotion to the Scottish Professional Football League (SPFL) in 2016, but they have not yet played either Hearts or Hibs in a SPFL match. Civil Service Strollers and Spartans take part in the North Edinburgh Derby in the Lowland Football League, while Edinburgh University are also involved in the league. The East of Scotland League also features derby matches, with six clubs based in Edinburgh.

The term is also used for matches in women's football, including games between Hibernian, Hearts and Spartans.

Festival Cup

In 1985, an Edinburgh select team composing of players from Hearts, Hibs and Meadowbank Thistle played Bayern Munich in a "Festival Cup" challenge match at Tynecastle. The Festival Cup was reintroduced in 2003, to tie in with the annual Edinburgh Festival. The local media speculated that clubs from cities twinned with Edinburgh, including Bayern Munich and Dynamo Kiev, would be invited to participate in an annual Edinburgh tournament. Eventually, the clubs settled for playing a single derby match on the last Saturday before the start of the 2003–04 Scottish Premier League season. The SPL did not help the launch of the Festival Cup by scheduling a league derby match two weeks after the Festival Cup match, also at Easter Road. Hearts won the first Festival Cup match 1–0 with a goal by Andy Webster.

The clubs then had difficulty scheduling the 2004–05 match, partly due to the clubs arranging other friendly matches. The Festival Cup match was eventually played at Tynecastle on 4 September 2004. Both teams were well below full strength because several players were training with their national teams. Playing the game in September also meant that the game was played after the start of the 2004–05 Scottish Premier League season and after the end of the Festival. Hearts won the second and to date last Festival Cup match 3–1. The Hearts goals were scored by Craig Sives, Mark de Vries and Dennis Wyness, while Stephen Dobbie scored a penalty kick for Hibs. The match was not in played in 2005 as Hearts had a protracted search for a new head coach. It was not resurrected in 2006 and has not been contested since.

New Year derby
An Edinburgh derby match has traditionally been played at New Year, as both 1 January and 2 January are bank holidays in Scotland. The New Year derby match has sometimes not taken place in recent years, due to a shutdown in early January being introduced to the schedule. Of the 94 Edinburgh derbies played at New Year, Hibs hold a slight lead of 32 to 30 wins by Hearts.

During the 1940 New Year's Day match, Easter Road was covered with a thick fog that would normally cause a football match to be abandoned. Due to the match being played during wartime, and it being broadcast widely by the BBC for the entertainment of soldiers stationed overseas, the War Office ordered play to go ahead to avoid alerting the Luftwaffe to the bad weather conditions. Commentator Bob Kingsley could not see the pitch either and had to improvise. Using a series of runners to tell him if there were any goals scored, he created his own version of the match. This was later described in The Scotsman as "Fawlty Towers ahead of itself" and adapted into a BBC Radio Four play by Scottish playwright, Andrew Dallmeyer.

Results and records
Hearts have the better record in derbies, with 148 to 86 wins by Hibs in 333 matches played in the three main Scottish competitions. There have been 658 Edinburgh derbies to date, meaning that just under half of all derbies have been played in other competitions and friendlies. Including these other fixtures, Hearts have won 290 derbies and Hibs have won 206. During the 2017–18 season, Hearts manager Craig Levein said that Hearts winning was the "natural order" of the fixture, with Hibs fans and manager Neil Lennon making light of these comments in the subsequent derby, which Hibs won.

Since the creation of the Scottish Premier Division in 1975 and the introduction of four league games between clubs in a Scottish season, neither club has managed to win all four league derbies in a season. Hearts have achieved three wins and a draw five times, in 1985–86, 1989–90, 1990–91, 1996–97 and 2006–07. Hibs' best record in a league season is also three wins and a draw, in 1975–76. Hearts whitewashed Hibs in the 2011–12 season, winning all three league games and the Scottish Cup Final; however, a fourth league fixture was not possible as the clubs were not in the same section of the league after the split.

League results

Scottish Cup results

League Cup results

Single game records
Hibs recorded the biggest margin of victory in a competitive match with a 7–0 victory at Tynecastle on 1 January 1973. The biggest win in other matches was a 10–2 Hearts victory in a friendly match on 12 August 1893. The largest number of goals scored in a competitive match was when Hearts won 8–3 in a league match on 21 September 1935. Hearts hold the record margin in the Scottish Cup with a 5–0 victory on 1 February 1955, and the record margin in the Scottish League Cup with a 6–1 victory on 11 August 1956.

Prolific goalscorers
John Robertson scored 27 goals against Hibs in competitive games. Robertson was nicknamed "The Hammer of Hibs" due to his prolific goal record in derbies. Both Bobby Walker (33) and Tommy Walker (29) scored more goals in derbies than Robertson, when games in local competitions are considered.

Gordon Smith is the top goalscorer in Edinburgh derbies for Hibs, with 15 goals. Smith played for Hearts and Dundee later in his career and became the only player to have won the Scottish league championship with three different clubs. James McGhee scored at least 24 goals for Hibs in the early years of the fixture. The real figure is probably higher as he played in a lot of games where only the result is known and not all the scorers were recorded.

Barney Battles Jr. scored 11 goals in less than a month versus Hibs in 1929; five in the 8–2 Dunedin Cup final victory on 17 April 1929, two in the 5–1 Wilson Cup Final victory on 30 April 1929 and four in the 5–1 Rosebery Charity Cup Final victory on 11 May 1929.

Hat-tricks

Sixteen hat-tricks have been scored in competitive Edinburgh derbies by fifteen players, nine for Hearts and seven for Hibs. Bobby Walker is the only player to score multiple hat-tricks, and Mark de Vries for Hearts and Joe Baker for Hibs are the only players to score four goals in one derby. The majority of these hat-tricks were scored in the first one hundred years of the derby's existence, with only three occurring in the last fifty years.

Players with both clubs

This is a list of players who played at least one competitive first team fixture for both clubs. Only four players have scored for both Hearts and Hibs in Edinburgh derbies – Ralph Callachan, Alan Gordon, Darren Jackson and Gordon Smith.

References

External links
 A tale of one city: Edinburgh – These Football Times (2015)

Scotland football derbies
Heart of Midlothian F.C.
Hibernian F.C.
Football in Edinburgh
Recurring sporting events established in 1875